Oscar Bergendahl (born 8 March 1995) is a Swedish handball player who plays for SC Magdeburg and the Swedish national team.

He represented Sweden at the 2021 World Men's Handball Championship in Egypt.

Individual awards
Best defender of the European Championship: 2022
 All-Star Team as Best pivot Danish League 2021–22

References

1995 births
Living people
Swedish male handball players
Handball-Bundesliga players
Expatriate handball players
Swedish expatriate sportspeople in Denmark
Swedish expatriate sportspeople in Germany